Aliaksandra Sasnovich was the defending champion, but lost in the quarterfinals to Tímea Babos.

Babos went on to win the tournament, defeating Océane Dodin in the final, 6–3, 4–6, 7–5.

Seeds

Main draw

Finals

Top half

Bottom half

References 
 Main draw

Internationaux Féminins de la Vienne - Singles